The Taiwan Stock Exchange Capitalization Weighted Stock Index, TWSE Capitalization Weighted Stock Index, or TAIEX is a stock market index for companies traded on the Taiwan Stock Exchange (TWSE). TAIEX covers all of the listed stocks excluding preferred stocks, full-delivery stocks and newly listed stocks, which are listed for less than one calendar month. It was first published in 1967 by TWSE with 1966 being the base year with a value of 100.

Annual Returns 
The following table shows the annual development of the TAIEX since 1966.

References

External links
 TAIEX page on the Taiwan Index Plus
 Bloomberg page for TWSE:IND
 Reuters page for .TWII

Taiwanese stock market indices